Paul C. Hillegonds (born March 4, 1949) was a Republican member of the Michigan House of Representatives.  He served as co-speaker with Democrat Curtis Hertel from 1993 until 1994.

Hillegonds received his bachelor's degree from the University of Michigan and a law degree from Thomas M. Cooley Law School.

Hillegonds was first elected to the state house in 1978, beginning his service in 1979.  He previously had been a legislative aid and campaign chairman for U.S. Representative Philip Ruppe.  He was the leader of the Republicans in the house beginning in 1987.  He served as speaker of the house from 1995-1996, after having been co-speaker for one term.

In 1997 Hillegonds left the legislature to become president of Detroit Renaissance.  He remained in this position for nine years.  In 2006 he was a co-leader of 'One United Michigan the main group opposed to the end of affirmative action on the ballot at the time.

Hillegonds now works as the director of government relations for DTE Energy.

In early 2013 Hillegonds was appointed director of the newly formed Southeast Michigan Regional Transit Authority.

Origin of the name Hillegonds 
The name Hillegonds is originally Dutch. It is a matronymic and stands for "the child of Hillegond", a variant of the  name Hildegonde. The family name probably does not occur any more in The Netherlands.

Sources
Daniel Loepp. Sharing the Balance of Power: An Examinnation of Shared Power in the Michigan House of Representatives, 1993-94. Ann Arbor: University of Michigan Press, 1999.
Forbes bio of Hillegonds

Notes

Speakers of the Michigan House of Representatives
Republican Party members of the Michigan House of Representatives
University of Michigan alumni
Living people
1949 births
Western Michigan University Cooley Law School alumni
Place of birth missing (living people)
20th-century American politicians